Ricardo Antonio Suriñach Carreras was bishop for the Roman Catholic Diocese of Ponce. Suriñach Carreras was ordained priest in Ponce on 13 April 1957. He was subsequently named bishop of Ponce in 2000 by Pope John Paul II. Suriñach Carreras was a university professor, advisor and lecturer prior to becoming bishop.

Life
Suriñach Carreras was born in Mayagüez, Puerto Rico, on 1 April 1928. He obtained his B.A. degree from the Pontifical Catholic University of Puerto Rico. He subsequently completed his theological training at the Pontifical University of Saint Thomas Aquinas, and completed a Ph.D. in Counseling Education from Fordham University. He served as chaplain in the Puerto Rico National Guard after he completed specialized training at the U.S. Army Chaplain School covering training through the advanced officer level.

References

Notes

Episcopal succession

1928 births
2005 deaths
Bishops appointed by Pope John Paul II
Fordham University alumni
People from Mayagüez, Puerto Rico
21st-century Roman Catholic bishops in Puerto Rico
Pontifical University of Saint Thomas Aquinas alumni
20th-century Roman Catholic bishops in Puerto Rico
Burials at Cementerio Las Mercedes
Roman Catholic bishops of Ponce